Sir Robert Gilmour Colquhoun   (9 January 1803 – 10 November 1870) was a Scottish diplomat.

Colquhoun was born on Jamaica Street, Glasgow, and baptised in Luss, Dumbartonshire, the eldest and only surviving son of Robert Colquhoun, 16th of Camstradden and Harriet Farrer. He was educated at Pembroke College, Oxford. He was appointed Consul in Bucharest, Romania on 18 January 1835, Consul-General on 15 December 1837, and Agent and Consul-General on 18 November 1851. He received the Order of the Nichan Iftikhar. He was employed in Bosnia in 1854.

He was appointed Agent and Consul-General in Egypt on 14 January 1859. He served there until he retired in 1865 with the confidence and respect of the British government, and the rank of Knight Commander of the Order of the Bath.

He died in Pitlochry, aged 67.

References

External links

1803 births
1870 deaths
Alumni of Pembroke College, Oxford
British consuls-general in Egypt
Knights Commander of the Order of the Bath
Diplomats from Glasgow